The 2016–17  Linafoot season is the 56th since its establishment as the top-flight association football league of the DR Congo. A total of 28 clubs participated in the First Round, divided in three regional groups, with 8 teams advancing to the nationwide Championship Round. TP Mazembe won the domestic league.

First round
There were three regional divisions with 8 to 10 teams. Advancing to the Championship Round were 2 teams from East, 3 from West and 3 from Center-South.

Zone de développement Est

Zone de développement Ouest

Zone de développement Centre-Sud

Final round

References

Linafoot seasons
Congo
football
football